A total lunar eclipse took place on Friday, June 14, 1946. The northern tip of the moon passed through the center of the Earth's shadow. This was the first central lunar eclipse of Saros series 129.

Visibility
It was completely visible over South America, Europe, Africa, Asia, Australia, seen rising over South America, Europe and Africa and setting over Asia and Australia.

Related lunar eclipses

Lunar year series

Saros series

It last occurred on June 3, 1928 and will next occur on June 25, 1964.

This is the 34th member of Lunar Saros 129. The previous event was the June 1928 lunar eclipse. The next event is the June 1964 lunar eclipse. Lunar Saros 129 contains 11 total lunar eclipses between 1910 and 2090. Solar Saros 136 interleaves with this lunar saros with an event occurring every 9 years 5 days alternating between each saros series.

Half-Saros cycle
A lunar eclipse will be preceded and followed by solar eclipses by 9 years and 5.5 days (a half saros). This lunar eclipse is related to two total solar eclipses of Solar Saros 136.

See also
List of lunar eclipses
List of 20th-century lunar eclipses

Notes

External links

1946-06
1946 in science
Central total lunar eclipses